Manuel Paner (born May 17, 1949), better known as Manny Paner, is a Filipino retired professional basketball player.

Player profile
Paner was born in Cebu City, Philippines. During his prime, he was known for his strong rebounding, defense and deadly hook shot.  At a mere 6'2", he would play center and sometimes defend the opposing team's American imports.

During the late 1960s and early 1970s, Paner played for the San Miguel Braves in the MICAA, along with other Cebuano cagers Rosalio Martirez and Alejandrito Miego, to a name of few.

During the PBA's inaugural season in 1975, he was the center in the league's first Mythical Team, and in 1978, he left Royal Tru-Orange to sign with Great Taste what was then the league's biggest contract that paid him a whopping Php8,000 a month.  He later played briefly for CDCP Road Builders, and in 1982, he was signed back to San Miguel where he ended his career in 1986.

In 2000, he was named a member of the PBA's 25 Greatest Players, and was inducted into the PBA Hall of Fame in 2007.

International career
In 1972, Paner appeared at the Olympic Games in Munich, Germany as a member of the country's national basketball team.

Personal life
Paner is married to former actress Daisy Romualdez. The couple have two adopted daughters, Kristina and Danita.

References

Living people
Sportspeople from Cebu City
Basketball players from Cebu
1949 births
Olympic basketball players of the Philippines
Basketball players at the 1972 Summer Olympics
Philippines men's national basketball team players
Filipino men's basketball players
1974 FIBA World Championship players
Power forwards (basketball)
Centers (basketball)
San Miguel Beermen players
Great Taste Coffee Makers players
Cebuano people
UV Green Lancers basketball players